Phutthaisong is a district (amphoe) in the northern part of Buriram province, northeastern Thailand.

Geography
Neighboring districts are (from the south clockwise) Khu Mueang of Buriram Province, Mueang Yang of Nakhon Ratchasima province, Ban Mai Chaiyaphot of Buriram, Nong Song Hong of Khon Kaen province, Na Pho of Buriram, Yang Sisurat and Phayakkhaphum Phisai of Maha Sarakham province, and Chumphon Buri of Surin province.

Motto
The Phutthaisong District's Motto is "Ancient moat, worship Big buddha image, beautiful silk, Sra Bau lake so Shady."

Administration
The district is divided into seven sub-districts (tambon), which are further subdivided into 97 villages (muban). Phutthaisong is a sub-district municipality (thesaban tambon) which covers parts of tambon Phutthaisong, Mafueang and Ban Chan. There are a further seven tambon administrative organizations (TAO).

Missing numbers are tambon which now form Ban Mai Chaiyaphot district.

References

External links
amphoe.com (Thai) 

Phutthaisong